Cryoturris dominicensis is an extinct species of sea snail, a marine gastropod mollusk in the family Mangeliidae.

Description

Distribution
This extinct marine species has been found in strata of Cercado Formation of Santo Domingo.

References

 
 W. P. Woodring. 1970. Geology and paleontology of canal zone and adjoining parts of Panama: Description of Tertiary mollusks (gastropods: Eulimidae, Marginellidae to Helminthoglyptidae). United States Geological Survey Professional Paper 306(D): 299–452

External links

dominicensis